Eduardo Alfredo Juan Bernardo Frei Ruiz–Tagle (born 24 June 1942) is a Chilean politician and civil engineer who served as president of Chile from 1994 to 2000. He was also a Senator, fulfilling the role of President of the Senate from 2006 to 2008. He attempted a comeback as the candidate of the ruling Concertación coalition for the 2009 presidential election, but was narrowly defeated. His father was Eduardo Frei Montalva, president of Chile from 1964 to 1970.

Early life
Frei was born in Santiago to Eduardo Frei Montalva and María Ruiz-Tagle Jiménez. He received all his schooling at the Luis Campino Institute. He then attended the University of Chile, where he graduated as a civil engineer, specializing in hydraulics. After graduation, he followed advanced courses in management in Italy.

Political career
Frei took his first steps in politics while at the university, where he was a student leader. In 1958, he joined the Christian Democrat party, and in 1964 participated actively in his father's successful presidential campaign. Between 1969 and 1988 he concentrated on his profession, as one of the partners of Sigdo Koppers S.A., the largest engineering company in Chile.

In 1988 Frei founded and promoted the Comité Pro Elecciones Libres ("Committee for the promotion of free elections"). In 1989, he was elected Senator for Santiago, obtaining the highest number of votes in the whole country. In the Senate, he presided over the Treasury and Budget Commission and was a member of the Housing Commission.

Presidency

In 1992, Frei participated in the presidential primary election of his coalition, defeating Ricardo Lagos, and then went on to win the presidential elections of 1993 by securing 58% of the votes cast. 

He took office on 11 March 1994 and was succeeded by Lagos in 2000. Frei's presidency was notable in making improvements in health and education as well as reducing poverty. 

Eduardo Frei Ruiz-Tagle, had particularly good relations with his Argentine counterpart Carlos Menem. During Frei's ternure the Laguna del Desierto territorial dispute with Argentina was solved, albeit the arbitage favoured the Argentine position.

Following the end of his presidency, Frei assumed, as a former President, a seat as senator-for-life in Congress.

Return to the Congress
Since constitutional reforms in 2005 abolished life senators from 2006, Frei ran for and won an elected Senate seat in the December 2005 parliamentary elections in the electoral district of Valdivia Province and Osorno Province, together with Andrés Allamand. On 11 March 2006 Frei became President of the Senate, like his father, who was also President of the Senate after being President of the Republic.

Frei, whose grandfather Eduardo Frei Schlinz had emigrated to Chile from Switzerland, obtained Swiss citizenship in February 2009.

In 2009-2010 elections, Frei ran for the presidency of Chile for a second time, again as the candidate of the centre-left Concertación center-coalition, promising continuity of the popular outgoing President Michelle Bachelet's path. Some of his presidential campaign banners and billboards pictured him, accompanied by Bachelet over his left shoulder. In the first round of the elections, held on 13 December 2009, Frei held 29.60% of the official vote, second to his opponent Sebastián Piñera, who led with 44.05%. Since neither candidate received more than half of the total votes, a runoff election was held on Sunday, 17 January 2010. The first preliminary results announced by the Deputy Interior Ministry at 21:00 GMT on election day gave Piñera 51.87% and Frei holding 48.12%. Frei conceded to Piñera at 21:44 GMT.

In a graceful exit from the campaign, Frei stated, "The election is over and Chileans have shown civic maturity.... The results clearly show the solidity of our democracy. It has been clean and transparent in line with our tradition. I want to congratulate Pinera, to whom most Chileans have given their trust for the next four years."''

Styles, honours and arms

National honours
 Grand Master (1994-2000) and Collar of the Order of Merit
 Grand Master (1994-2000) and Collar of the Order of Bernardo O'Higgins

Foreign honours
:
 Commander of the Order of the Sun (Peru)
:
 Knight Grand Cross with Collar of the Order of Merit of the Italian Republic (19 July 1995)
:
 Grand Cross of the Grand Order of King Tomislav ("For outstanding achievements in promoting the development of friendship and fruitful cooperation in political, cultural and economic development between the Republic of Croatia and the Republic of Chile, and in promoting peace, democracy, stability and international cooperation in the world on the basis of the principles of the UN Charter and the provisions of international law." - 8 November 1994)
:
 Honorary Recipient of the Order of the Crown of the Realm (1995)
:
 Grand Cross of the Order of Merit of the Republic of Poland
:
 Knight of the Collar of the Order of Isabella the Catholic, 3 March 1995
 Member of the Club de Madrid, an independent non-profit organization created to promote democracy and change in the international community, composed by more than 100 members: former democratic Heads of State and Government from around the world.

 Medal of the Oriental Republic of Uruguay (1996)

Arms

References

External links 

Senado's Personal profile
Biography by CIDOB Foundation (in Spanish)
Genealogical chart of Frei-Montalva Family

|-

|-

|-

|-

|-

|-

|-

|-

1942 births
20th-century Chilean engineers
Candidates for President of Chile
Children of presidents of Chile
Chilean people of Austrian descent
Chilean people of German descent
Chilean people of Spanish descent
Chilean people of Swiss descent
Christian Democratic Party (Chile) politicians
Collars of the Order of Isabella the Catholic
Eduardo Frei Ruiz-Tagle
Knights Grand Cross with Collar of the Order of Merit of the Italian Republic
Legislators with life tenure
Living people
Members of the Senate of Chile
Politicians from Santiago
Presidents of Chile
Presidents of the Senate of Chile
3 Frei Ruiz-Tagle, Eduardo
Recipients of the Order of Merit of the Republic of Poland
Recipients of the Medal of the Oriental Republic of Uruguay
Recipients of the Order of Prince Yaroslav the Wise, 1st class
University of Chile alumni
Chilean civil engineers